Jorma Johannes Limmonen (29 September 1934 – 27 November 2012) was a Finnish boxer who competed in the featherweight division in the 1960 and 1964 Olympics. He won a bronze medal in 1960, losing in a semifinal to the eventual champion Francesco Musso, and was eliminated in the second bout in 1964.

Limmonen won ten consecutive national titles in 1953–64, which remains a national record. He retired in 1964 and later worked as a boxing coach and a sports journalist. In 2006 he was inducted into the Finnish Boxing Hall of Fame.

1964 Olympic results
Jorma Limmonen competed as a featherweight in the 1964 Olympic boxing tournament in Tokyo.  Here are his results from that event:

 Round of 32: defeated Jan de Rooj of the Netherlands (referee stopped contest)
 Round of 16 lost to Constantin Crudu of Romania by a 2-3 decision

References

1934 births
2012 deaths
Sportspeople from Helsinki
Olympic boxers of Finland
Olympic bronze medalists for Finland
Boxers at the 1960 Summer Olympics
Boxers at the 1964 Summer Olympics
Olympic medalists in boxing
Finnish male boxers
Medalists at the 1960 Summer Olympics
Featherweight boxers